The Castle is a Grade II listed public house at 25 Church Street, Macclesfield, Cheshire, SK11 6LB.

It is on the Campaign for Real Ale's National Inventory of Historic Pub Interiors.

It was built as houses in the late 18th century, which were converted into a pub in the 19th century. It closed in early 2014 and was for sale for some years. It re-opened on 24th September 2021 with new owners and a new lease of life.

See also

Listed buildings in Macclesfield
Macclesfield Castle

References

Grade II listed pubs in Cheshire
National Inventory Pubs
Macclesfield